The 2020–21 season is Pallacanestro Varese's 76th in existence and the club's 12th consecutive season in the top tier Italian basketball.

Overview

Kit 
Supplier: Macron / Sponsor: Openjobmetis

Players

Current roster

Depth chart

Squad changes

In

|}

Out

|}

Confirmed 

|}

Coach

Unsuccessful deals 
The following deal never activated and the player's contract was withdrawn before the beginning of the season.

Competitions

Supercup

Serie A

See also 

 2020–21 LBA season
 2020 Italian Basketball Supercup

References 

2020–21 in Italian basketball by club